The Gaisser–Hillas function is used in astroparticle physics. It parameterizes the longitudinal particle density in a cosmic ray air shower. The function was proposed in 1977 by Thomas K. Gaisser and Anthony Michael Hillas.

The number of particles  as a function of traversed atmospheric depth  is expressed as

Using substitutions

,    and  

the function can be written in an alternative one-parametric (m) form as

References 

Cosmic rays